Yekaterina Georgievna Gradova (6 October 1946 – 22 February 2021) was a Russian film actress who appeared in two Soviet blockbuster films  Seventeen Moments of Spring  and  The Meeting Place Cannot Be Changed.

Career
Gradova played her first notable role at the beginning of 1966 in the Boris Yashin's drama Autumn Weddings. Later she starred in films rather infrequently, preferring theater to cinema. She was an actress in the Theater of Satire until the  1980s. Also at the Mayakovsky Theatre, Gradova played a major role in the play Talents and Admirers, which was made into a film in 1971.

Her most significant success was the role of pianist (clandestine radio-operator) Kate of Soviet spy Standartenfuhrer von Stierlitz in the Soviet blockbuster TV serial Seventeen Moments of Spring (1968) directed by Tatyana Lioznova. This serial was about the life of the Soviet spy Maksim Isaev, operating in Nazi Germany under the name Max Otto von Stierlitz, played by the leading Soviet film star Vyacheslav Tikhonov. The serial immediately brought immense popularity for the main actors. Later she acknowledged that for those who starred in the serial: This was not just a movie, this was like a destiny. Indeed, for many years each of the stars of the serial received tremendous attention and were often invited to various conferences, asked for interviews, etc.

In 1979 she played a small but significant role (Svetlana Volokushina) in another Soviet blockbuster The Meeting Place Cannot Be Changed (starring another great Soviet film star and bard Vladimir Vysotsky).

Personal life
In the spring of 1971, Ekaterina Gradova joined the Theater of Satire (Moscow), one of the leading Soviet theaters. The 25-year-old actress immediately attracted the attention of the star of the theater Andrei Mironov. In autumn they were married, and after two years their daughter, Maria, (now the popular actress Maria Mironova) was born. However, the relationship ran into problems. Soon after the birth of his daughter Mironov left the family. His new choice was the star of popular Soviet musical comedy Hussar Ballad Larisa Golubkina. In 1974, Mironov finally moved to live with Golubkina, and two years later got a formal divorce from Gradova.

Gradova died at the age of 74 from a stroke.

References

External links
 

Soviet film actresses
1946 births
2021 deaths
20th-century Russian actresses
Actresses from Moscow
Recipients of the Order of Friendship of Peoples
Honored Artists of the RSFSR
Saint Tikhon's Orthodox University alumni
Moscow Art Theatre School alumni